The 2011 Souris/Mouse River flood in Canada and the United States occurred in June and was greater than a hundred-year flooding event for the river. The US Army Corps of Engineers estimated the flood to have a recurrence interval of two to five centuries.

The Souris River begins in southeastern Saskatchewan, flows southeast into North Dakota, then to southwestern Manitoba. It is a tributary of the Assiniboine River, which it meets near Treesbank, Manitoba, and flows east to meet the Red River of the North in Winnipeg. 

The flooding affected Saskatchewan and North Dakota; notably in Minot, where it overtopped levees and caused the evacuation of about 11,000 residents. The flooding in Minot was worse than the 1969 and 1881 floods; many other towns along the river were affected and many acres of farmland were inundated.

Background
Flooding in Saskatchewan the previous summer, in addition to heavy snowfall and a thick snowpack from the previous La Niña winter added to overflow on rivers across North America. In May 2011, heavy rains and thunderstorms driven by a series of cut off lows migrating westward triggered more flooding on watersheds in the southern Prairie Provinces, as some communities received nearly the annual rainfall in less than two months.

Flood effects

Saskatchewan
In early May, flash flooding occurred between the Souris River source and the Assiniboine River, as Kingsley No. 124, Saskatchewan saw its worst flooding in over 50 years. Towards late May, barely half Saskatchewan's agricultural crops had been seeded, while southeastern Saskatchewan, surrounding the Souris River was the worst-hit. However, even as the flooding continued in northern Saskatchewan, Alberta, and the Northwest Territories, significant fires burned while the weather remained dry and lightning was able to spark new blazes.

On June 17, Weyburn, Saskatchewan became one of 19 provincial communities to declare a state of emergency from the severe flooding, after a power outage caused the failure of the city's waste treatment plant; Saskatoon, surrounding the South Saskatchewan River, also experienced street-level floods. The next day, more flash flooding resulted in flooded homes and basements from Regina to Weyburn, while Estevan declared a state of emergency from flooding.

By June 19, a dike breach flooded the village of Roche Percee, Saskatchewan, forcing about 150 residents to evacuate. A trailer park in downstream Estevan also evacuated about 400 people. Several major highways, including part of Highway 47, Saskatchewan Highway 56 and the Trans-Canada Highway 1 near Sintaluta were closed due to flooding damage.

Water was released from two area dams to ease the pressure on the local reservoirs. At the start of summer, the flood crest moved downstream into the United States.

North Dakota

Forecasters and hydrologists anticipated a full dike breach on the Souris by June 25 or 26 after the river began overtopping it on June 22. Close to 12,000 residents were evacuated from their homes.

The flood was expected to exceed the 1969 levels, while residents seek relief in evacuation shelters nearby.

On June 24, the Souris River exceeded record flood levels at Minot.

Manitoba
Manitoba officials began preparing for the third time in 2011 for Souris flooding in late June as communities were expecting record flooding, after already experiencing flooding on the Red River and the Assiniboine River, which amounted to a 300-year flood. Also lake levels at Lake Manitoba will continue to be high or may even rise more due to the high flows on the Souris River that flows into the Assiniboine east of Brandon near Treesbank. The province has stated that the flood protection and the Portage Diversion will be pushed to their limits again.

At least 85 families were evacuated from Souris, Manitoba by June 27. On July 2, the army from CFB Shilo was sent in to help with the sandbagging and building up of dykes. The river crested at Melita on July 4, at Souris on July 5 and Wawanesa on July 6. With dry weather the peak levels were a little lower than forecast and the dikes held. See the record from Manitoba Water Stewardship's daily flood report for July 7.

See also
2011 Mississippi River flood
2011 Missouri River floods
2011 Assiniboine River flood
2011 Red River flood

References

External links

Minot Floods: A Town Devastated — slideshow by Life magazine
Minot: When The Water Recedes Documentary produced by Prairie Public Television
Minot Rebuilding Dreams Documentary produced by Prairie Public Television

Souris River
Floods in Canada
Floods in the United States
Flood,Souris River
Flood,Souris River
Minot, North Dakota
Flood,2011,Souris River
Flood,2011,Souris River
Flood,2011,Souris River
Souris River flood
Souris River flood
Souris River flood
Souris River